Lower Bavaria (Bavarian: Niedabayern) is one of the seven administrative regions of Bavaria, Germany, located in the east of the state. It consists of nine districts and 258 municipalities (including three cities).

Geography 
Lower Bavaria is subdivided into two regions – Landshut and Donau-Wald. Recent election results mark it as the most conservative part of Germany, generally giving huge margins to the CSU. This part of Bavaria includes the Bavarian Forest, a well-known tourist destination in Germany, and the Lower Bavarian Upland.

Landkreise(districts)
 Deggendorf
 Dingolfing-Landau
 Freyung-Grafenau
 Kelheim
 Landshut
 Passau
 Regen
 Rottal-Inn
 Straubing-Bogen

Kreisfreie Städte(district-free towns)
 Landshut
 Passau
 Straubing

Population

Economy 
The Gross domestic product (GDP) of the region was 48.5 billion € in 2018, accounting for 1.4% of German economic output. GDP per capita adjusted for purchasing power was 36,100 € or 120% of the EU27 average in the same year. The GDP per employee was 100% of the EU average.

Main sights 

Next to the former ducal residences Landshut and Straubing and the baroque episcopal city of Passau, the city of Kelheim with the Befreiungshalle and Weltenburg Abbey belong to the major tourist attractions. To the scenic attractions belong the River Danube including the Donaudurchbruch at Weltenburg and the Bavarian Forest with Mount Großer Arber.

History 
The Duchy of Lower Bavaria was created for the first time with the First Bavarian partition in 1255 under duke Henry but there was no exact identity with the current territory. After the reunification in 1340, Bavaria was divided again in 1349, then in 1353 Bavaria-Straubing and Bavaria-Landshut were created in Lower Bavaria. In 1505 Bavaria was permanently reunited. For administrative purposes, Bavaria was split into Rentämter (plural of ). Lower Bavaria consisted of the Rentamt Landshut and Rentamt Straubing.

Control of Lower Bavaria was one of the issues involved in the War of the Bavarian Succession in 1778-9.

After the founding of the Kingdom of Bavaria following the dissolution of the Holy Roman Empire in 1805, the state was totally reorganized and, in 1808, divided into 15 administrative districts(German: Regierungsbezirke (singular Regierungsbezirk)), in Bavaria called Kreise (singular: Kreis). They were created in the fashion of the French departements, quite even in size and population, and named after their main rivers. In the following years, due to territorial changes (e. g. loss of Tyrol [to Italy and Austria], addition of the Palatinate), the number of districts was reduced to 8. One of these was the Unterdonaukreis (Lower Danube District). In 1837, King Ludwig I of Bavaria renamed the Kreise after historical territorial names and tribes. This also involved border changes or territorial swaps. Thus the Unterdonaukreis changed to Lower Bavaria. The district capital was moved from Passau to Landshut which was added from Isarkreis.

Lower Bavaria and Upper Palatinate were consolidated in 1932 in one administrative district. In 1954 the two districts were restored again. In 1972 Lower Bavaria was reshaped when the rural districts covered were reshaped too.

References

External links
Official website of government 
Official website of region 

 
NUTS 2 statistical regions of the European Union
Government regions of Germany